James Bevis (born 8 August 1976 in Hereford) is a British sports-shooter who won a bronze medal in Shooting at the 2012 Summer Paralympics in the Mixed 10 metre air rifle prone SH2.

References 

1976 births
Living people
British male sport shooters
Paralympic shooters of Great Britain
Paralympic bronze medalists for Great Britain
Paralympic medalists in shooting
Shooters at the 2012 Summer Paralympics
Medalists at the 2012 Summer Paralympics
Sportspeople from Hereford
Shooters at the 2020 Summer Paralympics
20th-century British people
21st-century British people